Manik Lal Ray (Manik Sir) (born 28 December 1949 – 26 July 2019) was a Bangladeshi politician, teacher and freedom fighter. He was a successful leader of the Bhasan Pani Movement in 8th and 9th decade of 20th century.

References

1949 births
2019 deaths
Bangladeshi politicians
Bangladeshi activists
People from Bharatpur, Rajasthan